Unión Deportiva Los Garres is a Spanish football club based in Murcia. Founded in 2007, it currently plays in Tercera División RFEF – Group 13, holding home matches at the Campo Municipal Las Tejeras, with a capacity of 1,000 people.

Season to season

4 seasons in Tercera División
1 season in Tercera División RFEF

References

External links
Soccerway team profile

Football clubs in the Region of Murcia
Association football clubs established in 2007
2007 establishments in Spain